Arian David Moreno Silva (born 23 January 2003) is a Venezuelan footballer who plays as a midfielder for Deportivo Anzoátegui.

Career statistics

Club

Notes

References

2003 births
Living people
People from Barcelona, Venezuela
Venezuelan footballers
Association football midfielders
Deportivo Anzoátegui players
Venezuelan Primera División players